Urdoviza Glacier is a glacier on western Livingston Island in the South Shetland Islands, Antarctica situated east of the northern portion of Etar Snowfield and north of Medven Glacier. Bulgarian mapping in 2005 and 2009.

The glacier is named after Cape Urdoviza on the Bulgarian Black Sea coast.

Location

See also
 List of glaciers in the Antarctic
 Glaciology

Maps
 L.L. Ivanov et al. Antarctica: Livingston Island and Greenwich Island, South Shetland Islands. Scale 1:100000 topographic map. Sofia: Antarctic Place-names Commission of Bulgaria, 2005.
 L.L. Ivanov. Antarctica: Livingston Island and Greenwich, Robert, Snow and Smith Islands. Scale 1:120000 topographic map.  Troyan: Manfred Wörner Foundation, 2009.

References
 Urdoviza Glacier. SCAR Composite Antarctic Gazetteer
 Bulgarian Antarctic Gazetteer. Antarctic Place-names Commission. (details in Bulgarian, basic data in English)

External links
 Urdoviza Glacier. Copernix satellite image

Glaciers of Livingston Island